Joan Perelló Alejo (born 6 October 1993, in Palma) is a Spanish Grand Prix motorcycle racer.

Career statistics

By season

Races by year

References

External links
 Profile on motogp.com

Living people
1993 births
Spanish motorcycle racers
125cc World Championship riders